Vazha-Pshavela (ვაჟა–ფშაველა) is a 2011 Georgian Biographical novel by author Miho Mosulishvili.

Anniversaries with which UNESCO is associated in 2010-2011
The General Conference, by its 35C/Resolution 72, approved the following list of anniversaries with which UNESCO is associated in 2010-2011 (listed in the French alphabetical order of Member States):

(24) 150th anniversary of the birth of Vaja-Pshavela, writer (1861-1915) (Georgia)

150th anniversary of the birth of Vaja-Pshavela
150th anniversary of the birth of Vaja-Pshavela, writer (1861-1915):

Vaja-Pshavela (the pseudonym of Luka Razikashvili, 1861-1915) was a Georgian thinker, poet and writer. Vaja-Pshavela's poetry represents the summit of nineteenth-century Georgian realism.

He was born in the small Pshavian village of Chargali. He graduated from teachers' seminary and studied law at Saint Petersburg University. Vaja-Pshavela wrote most of his verses, poems and stories in the vicinity of his native village. His works are mainly devoted to human relationships towards the material world. The national epic works of Georgian poetry in the nineteenth century and the revival of poetic epos are also connected with his name. Heroism, tragedy and humanity define the epic creativity of Vaja-Pshavela. His poems and narrative stories are widely translated into a number of languages.

Outline
This biographical novel will we know what to look like Vaja-Pshavela: from ancient Greek mythology characters Laocoön, the divine poet Homer and the genius Italian composer Giuseppe Verdi.

We see that it easily can be compared to the same level in creativity: Ovid, Goethe, Shakespeare, Robert Burns; but we see also how the original is Vaja-Pshavela and how many greatest are its meaning in today's world, whether is involved in the confrontation of East-West.

The book Vaja-Pshavela (And Phelypaea coccinea looks in chasm)''' show new version of life Vaja-Pshavela and unique style of his thinking.

The discovery may be regarded as the author's observation that the five epic poems of Vaja-Pshavela (Aluda Ketelauri (1888), Bakhtrioni (1892), Host and Guest (1893), The avenger of the blood (1897), Snake eater (1901)) is based on the principle Golden ratio, thus this poems resembles the works of Ancient and Renaissance authors.

Miho Mosulishvili asserts, that Vaja-Pshavela rising from the depth of creativity of Georgian mythology, which makes it original event on background of the world's literature and will significantly increase the magnitude of Georgian literature.

Characters
 Vaja-Pshavela Ilia Chavchavadze Giuseppe Verdi Akaki Tsereteli Ernest Hemingway Titsian Tabidze Johann Wolfgang von Goethe AnandavardhanaAnd others.

Awards
 October 8, 2011 - Gala (literary prize) in nomination: 'The best handbook'

Release details
 2011, Georgia, ვაჟა–ფშაველა'', Pub. date 25 May 2011, Hardcover (First edition - in Georgian)

References

External links
 Annotation for book of Miho Mosulishvili 'Vazha-Pshavela (And Phelypaea coccinea looks in chasm)'
 Važa-Pʻšavela
 Važa-Pʻšavela
 GALA Awards Ceremony in Renewed National Museum

Literature of Georgia (country)
2011 novels
21st-century Georgian novels
Biographical novels
Works by Miho Mosulishvili